Gorenskiye Vyselki is a rural locality (a selo) in Timiryazevskoye Rural Settlement, Novousmansky District, Voronezh Oblast, Russia. The population was 557 as of 2010. There are 8 streets.

Geography 
Gorenskiye Vyselki is located 7 km southeast of Novaya Usman (the district's administrative centre) by road. Kazanskaya Khava is the nearest rural locality.

References 

Rural localities in Novousmansky District